Tomáš Svoboda (born 19 March 1985) is a professional Czech triathlete and aquathlete. He won gold at the 2015 ETU European Aquathlon Championships, and is two time UIPM biathle World Champion (2013, 2017)  Tomáš is the twin brother of David Svoboda, 2012 Olympic Champion in the sport of Modern Pentathlon.

References

1985 births
Living people
Czech male triathletes
European Games competitors for the Czech Republic
Triathletes at the 2015 European Games